Amigoland Mall ("Amigo" means "friend" in Spanish) was an enclosed shopping mall located in Brownsville, Texas. The former mall, which now houses a tech center, is now called the Brownsville ITEC Center.

The  mall, developed by Melvin Simon & Associates (now Simon Property Group), opened in downtown Brownsville in 1974, with Montgomery Ward, JCPenney (which also featured a JCPenney Supermarket), and Dillard's as anchors. Other early tenants included McCrory Stores, Walgreens, and a two-screen movie theater. It later gained Bealls as an additional anchor.

In 1999, both JCPenney and Dillard's relocated to nearby Sunrise Mall. The loss of these stores caused declining traffic at Amigoland. The bankruptcy of Montgomery Ward a year later left the older mall devoid of anchors and shortly afterward, the mall was shuttered.

In 2002, the vacant mall was converted to classrooms and a tech center for Texas Southmost College.

References

Defunct shopping malls in the United States
Shopping malls in Texas
Shopping malls established in 1974
Shopping malls disestablished in 1999
Buildings and structures in Brownsville, Texas
1974 establishments in Texas
1999 disestablishments in Texas